Two special elections (known elsewhere as "by-elections") for Manila's 1st (North) district's seat in the Philippine Assembly were held on 1908. Justo Lukban won the second election, after Dominador Gómez, winner of the 1907 general election, was expelled from office, then won the first special election, finally only to resign his rights as member of the assembly.

These special elections were the first of its kind in the Philippines.

Background

The Nacionalista Party was brought about by the merger of the Union Nacionalista, which chose an evolutionary position on Philippine independence, and the Independistas, led by Alberto Barretto and Justo Lukban, which advocated immediate independence. The two organizations merged on March 2, 1907, to oppose the Progresista Party, which opposed independence, after withdrawing their platform of Philippine U.S. statehood.

Fernando Guerrero, who was earlier elected as counselors of the Nacionalistas along with Sergio Osmeña, and Lukban, were dropped from the ballot in favor of Dominador Gómez and Felipe del Mar. Guerrero and Lukban then set up Liga Nacional Independecia to oppose the Nacionalistas.

The 1st Philippine Legislature convened for the first time on October 16, 1907, after elections earlier that year. Osmeña was elected Speaker. Osmeña had then successfully prevented Gómez from taking his seat, questioning his citizenship, until he was elected speaker.

First election
By February 1908, Osmeña and his adjutant, Manuel L. Quezon, saw Gómez as their primary opponent for control of the legislature. Osmeña has most of the Nacionalistas behind him, while Gómez was counting on the support of the dissatisfied Nacionalistas and members of the Progresistas. In February, Gómez denounced the moves to unseat him in a speech before the assembly. Those who wanted to unseat Gómez planned to replace him with Lukban, who was the defeated candidate in the 1907 election. A day after his speech, the assembly moved to vacate Gómez's seat, 40–35. A week later, Gómez, in a letter to the assembly, said that he would no longer contest his removal, paving way for a special election. This also made the motions for reconsideration, and for an investigation to an extra "mysterious vote" for Gómez's removal, be moot and academic.

Gómez expressed his intention to run in the special election in March. Lukban also expressed his intention to run, seeing a rematch of the 1907 election.

Results

The March 30 election saw Gómez successfully defending his seat. His victory was celebrated at the Rizal Theater later that night, and rumors of him actually reclaiming his seat at the Ayuntamiento de Manila led to the Manila Police District securing the premises but Gómez did not show up.

By June, Osmeña read a letter by Gómez to the assembly of the latter resigning his rights as duly elected representative of Manila's first district. This means that the contested seat is again vacant.

Second election
The Nacionalistas have nominated José Turiano Santiago for the vacant seat on July 6. Meanwhile, Lukban contested the seat anew; Gómez, for his part, is contesting a seat at the newly provided Municipal Board of Manila. A clash between their supporters occurred at Calle Azcarraga at the eve of the election on August 11. Lukban's supporters, being led by Lope K. Santos, were first harassed by Gómez supporters, which later led to a full-blown riot. After the fight was dispersed, the Gómez supporters had a meeting at Calle Acuña, guarded by the police.

Results 

While Lukban won the assembly seat, Gómez lost the municipal board election to Ramon Diokno. Commissioner Rafael Palma, who was surprised of Gómez's defeat, attributed it to Gómez's attacks against Osmeňa, which reduced his popularity with the masses. A Manila Times editorial emphasized the victories of the Liga Popular Nacional against the regular Nacionalista Party; the latter was seen as being dominated by aristocrats, who are mostly mestizos. The election results were announced at the junction of the Puente de España and Escolta Street, at a screen set up in front of the La Extremeña Building.

Later that year, Diokno renounced his claims from the seat amidst the electoral protest filed by Gómez. Gómez later reclaimed his old assembly seat in 1909, when he won on a successful electoral protest against Lukban. Lukban later on became Mayor of Manila.

Notes

References

Special elections to the Congress of the Philippines
1908 elections in the Philippines
1908
Politics of Manila